David Charles Hudson (ca. 1962) is an Australian Aboriginal musician, entertainer and artist. Hudson is a multi-instrumentalist and was taught to play traditional didgeridoo from an early age. He also plays guitar, kit drums, percussion. He plays traditional music, as well as more ambient music, country-folk, rock, and new age.

Biography 
Steven Charles Hudson was born in the early 1960s and is a descendant of the Ewamin-Western Yalanji peoples of the western Far North Queensland region. He explained "I grew up in a household with uncles and aunts who painted and carved. I was taught traditional stories, so I was painting stories, and I learned what this line represents and this dot represents." He was also taught to play traditional didgeridoo. Hudson finished secondary schooling in 1979, then attended a teachers' college and was qualified as a recreation officer. According to Hudson "the majority of indigenous teenagers left school in year 10 and followed their fathers and grandfathers to work on railways, in construction or on cane fields."

In 1987 Hudson, his wife Cindy Judd, and other partners, established the Tjapukai Dance Theatre and the related Tjapukai Aboriginal Cultural Park in Kuranda. Hudson, as a dancer and musician, toured with Greek-American musician, Yanni, from 1996 to 2005 and appears on the artist's albums, Tribute (November 1997), Ethnicity (February 2003) and Yanni Live! The Concert Event (August 2006). From 1997 to 2012 Hudson was General Manager of  the Tjapukai Aboriginal Cultural Park.

2013 Hudson consulted for Dreamworld on the Gold Coast as cultural advisor, choreographer and script writer.
On 26 March 2014 Hudson was given an Honorary Doctorate  from James Cook University, Cairns for his outstanding service and distinguished public contribution to the Queensland community.  Exceptional service to the University through his willingness to assist students and researchers to obtain and interpret cultural knowledge and Exceptional contributions beyond expectations of his field of endeavour, as a role model who has influenced the thinking and general well-being of humanity.
October 2014 Hudson gave a TEDx talk titled "Have Didge will Travel" at TEDxJCUCairns. Hudson's talk explains how a boy once classified by the Government as fauna, grew up and is now able to spread a positive message about Aboriginal culture, especially through his passion for the didgeridoo.
Hudson worked on the film The Island of Dr. Moreau and played the Bisonman. He worked with Marlon Brando, Val Kilmer, David Thewlis, Neil Young, and Temuera Morrison.
Hudson continues to undertake motivational speaking, cultural workshops, original paintings and making customised didgeridoos.

In April 2018 Hudson performed at the official opening of the Sir John Monash Centre at Villers-Bretonneux in France. He presented the didgeridoo he had made for the occasion to Prime Minister Turnbull for inclusion in the museum.

Discography 

 Undara Dawn, 1988
 Touching the Sounds of Australia, 1988
 Australia: Sound of the Earth (by David Hudson, Steve Roach and Sarah Hopkins), Fortuna, February 1991
 Woolunda, Celestial Harmonies, 1993
 Rainbow Serpent – Music for Didgeridoo & Percussion, Celestial Harmonies (13096-2), September 1994
 Bedarra, 1996.
 Didgeridoo Spirit, September 1996
 Guardians of the Reef, November 1996.
 Heart of Australia, Indigenous Australia (IA2001D), November 1996
 The Art of Didgeridoo: Selected Pieces 1987–1997, 1997
 Bama Muralug: Aboriginal and Torres Strait Traditional Songs, February 1997
 Kuranda, February 1997
 The Sound of Gondwana: 176,000 Years in the Making (with Alan Dargin, Matthew Doyle, and Mark Atkins), Black Sun, February 1997
 Spirit in the Sky, February 1997
 Wangetti, February 1997
 Yigi Yigi: Solo Didgeridoo, February 1997
 Gudju Gudju, 1998
 Gunyal, Black Sun, March 1998.
 Walkabout, Indigenous Australia, 1999
 The Stolen Generation – Rosie’s Freedom, April 2000
 Australian Sun Records (partners David Hudson, Nigel Pegrum and Mark Mannock)
 Just Like a Dream, 2002
 Australian Savannah, February 2002
 Coolamon, February 2002
 Passions of the Reef, February 2002
 Postcard from David Hudson, February 2002
 Just a Dream, September 2002
 Castaway, May 2004
 Spirit Songs of the Great Barrier Reef, June 2005
 Woolunda Vol.2, 14 March 2006
 Very Best of David Hudson, August 2006
 Didgeralia, 2007
 The Naked Melody, July 2007
 Ooramin: the Meditative Digeridoo, 10 July 2007
 Jinna Jinna: Australian Aboriginal Dreamtime Stories, Australian Sun Records (ASR1001), July 2007
 Primal Elegance Didgeridoo/Piano with Mark Mannock, August 2007
 DreamRoads Country Rock'', September 2007
Credits:

References

External links 

 David Hudson official site
 
 
Profile at Reflections an Unofficial Yanni fan page
 David Hudson's Facebook
 David Hudson TEDxJCUCairns

Indigenous Australian musicians
Didgeridoo players
Living people
Year of birth missing (living people)
Place of birth missing (living people)